From January 24 to June 6, 2000, voters of the Democratic Party chose its nominee for president in the 2000 United States presidential election. Incumbent Vice President Al Gore was  selected as the nominee through a series of primary elections and caucuses culminating in the 2000 Democratic National Convention held from August 14 to 17, 2000, in Los Angeles, California, but he went on to lose the Electoral College in the general election against Governor George W. Bush held on November 7 of that year, despite winning the popular vote by 0.5%.

Primary race overview
The apparent front runner, incumbent Vice President Al Gore of Tennessee, only faced one major candidate in the primaries, U.S. Senator Bill Bradley of New Jersey. Both men campaigned to succeed term-limited incumbent Bill Clinton. During the course of the five-month primary season, Gore managed to win every single primary contest over his opponent, and easily won the party's nomination for the 2000 election.

Serious early speculation surrounded Bill Bradley, a U.S. Senator and former NBA player, who had long been considered a potential Democratic contender for the presidency. In December 1998, Bradley formed a presidential exploratory committee and began organizing a campaign. Gore, however, had been considered the favorite for the Democratic nomination as early as 1997, with the commencement of President Clinton’s second term. Though numerous candidates for the Democratic nomination tested the waters, including Senator John Kerry, Governor Howard Dean, Representative Richard Gephardt, and Reverend Jesse Jackson, only Gore and Bradley ultimately entered the contest.

Bradley campaigned as the liberal alternative to Gore, taking positions to the left of him on issues like universal health care, gun control, and campaign finance reform.
On the issue of taxes, Bradley trumpeted his sponsorship of the Tax Reform Act of 1986, which had significantly cut tax rates while abolishing dozens of loopholes. He voiced his belief that the best possible tax code would be one with low rates and no loopholes, but he refused to rule out the idea of raising taxes to pay for his health care program.

On public education, Bradley pushed for increased federal funding for schools under Title I, as well as the expansion of the Head Start program. He further promised to bring 60,000 new teachers into the education system annually by offering college scholarships to anyone who agreed to become a teacher after graduating. Bradley also made child poverty a significant issue in his campaign. Having voted against the Personal Responsibility and Work Opportunity Act, better known as the "Welfare Reform Act," which, he said, would result in even higher poverty levels, he promised to repeal it as president. He also promised to address the minimum wage, expand the Earned Income Tax Credit, allow single parents on welfare to keep their child support payments, make the Dependent Care Tax Credit refundable, build support homes for pregnant teenagers, enroll 400,000 more children in Head Start, and increase the availability of food stamps.

Although both Gore and Bradley showed comparable success in terms of fund-raising, Bradley lagged behind Gore in many polls from the start and never gained a competitive position. Despite the late endorsement of the Des Moines Register, Bradley went on to be defeated in the Iowa Caucus; Gore garnered 62.9% of the votes, while Bradley received only 36.6%.  Gore won the primary competition in New Hampshire as well, though by a significantly smaller margin, receiving 49.7% to Bradley’s 46.6%. After a resounding defeat on Super Tuesday, with Bradley failing to carry the majority of delegates in a single state, he withdrew from the race on March 9.

Since the advent of the modern presidential primary system began in 1972, Gore remains the only non-incumbent (Republican or Democrat) to sweep all the nominating contests held in a given year.

Candidates

Nominee

Withdrew during primaries or convention

Declined
Ann Richards, former Governor of Texas
Warren Beatty, actor
Jesse Jackson, civil rights leader and 1988 presidential candidate
Dick Gephardt, House Minority Leader from Missouri
John Kerry, U.S. Senator from Massachusetts
Jay Rockefeller, U.S. Senator from West Virginia
Ted Turner, media mogul
Paul Wellstone, U.S. Senator from Minnesota

Polling

Results

Statewide

Counties carried

Nationwide

Connecticut Senator Joe Lieberman was nominated for Vice President by voice vote. Lieberman became the first Jewish American ever to be chosen for this position by a major party. Other potential running-mates included:

 Tom Harkin, U.S. senator from Iowa
 Evan Bayh, U.S. senator from Indiana
 Barbara Boxer, U.S. senator from California
 John Edwards, U.S. senator from North Carolina
 Dianne Feinstein, U.S. senator from California
 Barbara Mikulski, U.S. senator from Maryland
 Dick Gephardt, U.S. House Minority Leader from Missouri
 Bob Graham, U.S. senator from Florida
 Jim Hunt, Governor of North Carolina
 John Kerry, U.S. senator from Massachusetts
 Bob Kerrey, U.S. senator and former Governor from Nebraska
 Zell Miller, U.S. senator from Georgia
 George Mitchell, former Senate Majority Leader from Maine
 Sam Nunn, former U.S. senator from Georgia
 Jeanne Shaheen, Governor of New Hampshire

See also
2000 Republican Party presidential primaries

References